The acronym FHCI can refer to two different Canadian highschools:

Forest Hill Collegiate Institute
Forest Heights Collegiate Institute